Adomako or Adomakoh is an Akan language surname with Ashanti origins. Notable people with this surname include:

Albert Adomakoh (1922–2016), Ghanaian economist, former governor of the Bank of Ghana
Alex Adomako-Mensah (born 1962), Ghanaian politician, member of the Parliament of Ghana
Daniel Adomako (born 1979), Ghanaian sprinter
Evans Adomako (born 1997), Ghanaian professional footballer

The name is also used in the following contexts:

 R v Adomako, a 1994 House of Lords case on gross negligence manslaughter

Surnames of Ashanti origin
Surnames of Akan origin
Ghanaian surnames